The Haunted Castle is a 1979 anthology of 12 fairy tales from around the world that have been collected and retold by Ruth Manning-Sanders. It is one in a long series of such anthologies by Manning-Sanders. This is a companion volume to Old Witch Boneyleg.

Table of contents
1. The Haunted Castle (Esthonian)
2. The Forbidden Valley (American Indian)
3. Crow and the Pelicans (Australian)
4. The Golden Kingdom (German soldier story)
5. The good old man, the thief, and the ghost (Indian)
6. The spirits in the rat-hole (African)
7. Dear Grey (Pomeranian)
8. Little pot, cook! (Czechoslovakian)
9. Melitsa the Beautiful (Hungarian)
10. The old woman and the oak tree (Slavonian)
11. The queen in the garden (German)
12. The gold spinner (Pomeranian)

Collections of fairy tales
1979 short story collections
Children's short story collections
British short story collections
Ghost stories
1979 children's books
Angus & Robertson books
1979 anthologies